Children from Overseas is a 10-minute 1940 Canadian documentary film, made by the National Film Board of Canada (NFB) as part of the wartime Canada Carries On series. The film was directed by Stanley Hawes and produced by Stuart Legg. Children from Overseas was an account of Britain's evacuee children who were sent to Canada during the Second World War. The film's French version title is Les Jeunes Réfugiés.

Synopsis
In 1940, during the Blitz, with London and other urban centres in England under constant nightly bombardment. parents have to make a momentous decision to protect their children. While anti-aircraft guns fire at the raiders, families seek shelter in air-raid shelters, ever fearful of being bombed. When Canada offers to take refugees, the first 1,500 children to be evacuated to Canada come from London, Dover, Portsmouth and the industrial north, all locations where German air raids are taking place.

Still ahead of them, the children faced a perilous ocean voyage through Nazi U-boat-invested waters.  Once they were safe in Canada, the children began to discover the sights and sounds of their new home. A train trip still awaited most of the children before they could meet their foster families.

Some of the new experiences, at first, were strange and exciting – seeing a Mountie, attending school and meeting new classmates, even the simple sight of a city bathed in lights after a year of blackouts. In a country not facing widespread rationing, the evacuated children have discovered corn-on-the-cob, hot dogs, Coca-Cola and a rich, new kind of ice cream. Snow on a wintery day is a new experience but the children find that celebrating Christmas is much the same, even 3,000 miles away from their homes.

Using a transatlantic radio connection, the evacuated children are able to share their new adventures with their parents in England.

Cast
 Canadian High Commissioner in London Vincent Massey as Himself (archival footage)

Production
Typical of the NFB's Second World War documentary short films in the Canada Carries On series, Children from Overseas was made in cooperation with the Director of Public Information, Herbert Lash. The film was created as a morale boosting propaganda film.

Children from Overseas was a compilation documentary edited to provide a coherent story, that relied on newsreel material as well additional footage shot for the film by cinematographers Roy Tash and J.D. Davidson, with on-location sound recording by technicians William H. Lane and C.J. Quick.

The deep baritone voice of stage actor Lorne Greene was featured in the narration of Children from Overseas. Greene, known for his work on both radio broadcasts as a news announcer at CBC as well as narrating many of the Canada Carries On series. His sonorous recitation led to his nickname, "The Voice of Canada", and to some observers, the "voice-of-God". When reading grim battle statistics or narrating a particularly serious topic, he was known as "The Voice of Doom".

Reception
Children from Overseas was produced in 35 mm for the theatrical market. Each film was shown over a six-month period as part of the shorts or newsreel segments in approximately 800 theatres across Canada. The NFB had an arrangement with Famous Players theatres to ensure that Canadians from coast-to-coast could see them, with further distribution by Columbia Pictures.

After the six-month theatrical tour ended, individual films were made available on 16 mm to schools, libraries, churches and factories, extending the life of these films for another year or two. They were also made available to film libraries operated by university and provincial authorities. A total of 199 films were produced before the series was canceled in 1959.

See also
 The Home Front (1940), a NFB documentary on the Canadian home front in the Second World War

References

Notes

Citations

Bibliography

 Bennett, Linda Greene. My Father's Voice: The Biography of Lorne Greene. Bloomington, Indiana: iUniverse, Inc., 2004. .
 Calder, Angus. The People’s War: Britain 1939–45. London: Jonathan Cape, 1969. .
 Ellis, Jack C. and Betsy A. McLane. New History of Documentary Film. London: Continuum International Publishing Group, 2005. .
 Lerner, Loren. Canadian Film and Video: A Bibliography and Guide to the Literature. Toronto: University of Toronto Press, 1997. .
 Rist, Peter. Guide to the Cinema(s) of Canada. Westport, Connecticut: Greenwood Publishing Group, 2001. .

External links
 
 Children from Overseas at NFB Collections website

1940 films
Canadian black-and-white films
Canadian short documentary films
Canadian World War II propaganda films
National Film Board of Canada documentaries
1940 documentary films
Films produced by Stuart Legg
Documentary films about child refugees
Films directed by Stanley Hawes
Films scored by Lucio Agostini
Canada Carries On
Columbia Pictures short films
Quebec films
Battle of Britain films
1940s English-language films
1940s Canadian films